Clash Royale is a free-to-play real-time strategy video game developed and published by Supercell. The game combines elements from collectible card games, tower defense, and multiplayer online battle arena. The game was released globally on March 2, 2016. Clash Royale reached $1 billion in revenue in less than a year on the market. In three years, Clash Royale made $2.5 billion in revenue according to market intelligence company Sensor Tower. It is the first spinoff of Clash of Clans.

Gameplay

Premise
Clash Royale is a tower rush video game which puts players in games featuring two or four players (1v1 or 2v2) in which the objective is to destroy more towers than their opponent(s), with each destroyed tower being represented as a "crown". Destruction of the opponent's "King's Tower" results in an instantaneous win as an automatic "three-crown" victory. Matches last three minutes, and if at that point both of the players/teams have an equal number of crowns (or none at all), the match continues into a two-minute overtime period. Here, the player who destroys an opposing tower wins instantaneously. If no towers are destroyed during overtime, there is a tiebreaker, where the tower with the lowest health is destroyed. If two towers have the same health, there is a draw. In rare instances in a normal game, if the King's Tower is destroyed at the same time by both players, this also results in a rare draw.

In Clash Royale, players are ranked by their number of trophies which are won or lost through multiplayer battles. Players level up their accounts and King Towers by gaining Experience points through donating and upgrading cards. King Tower levels can reach level 14, and player levels can reach level 50; these factor into the competitive match-making system.

There are twenty-one playing arenas in total (excluding the Training Camp tutorial area): Goblin Stadium, Bone Pit, Barbarian Bowl, P.E.K.K.A's Playhouse, Spell Valley, Builder's Workshop, Royal Arena, Frozen Peak, Jungle Arena, Hog Mountain, Electro Valley, Spooky Town, Rascal's Hideout, Serenity Peak, Miner's Mine, Executioner's Kitchen, Royal Crypt, Silent Sanctuary, Dragon Spa, and Legendary Arena. Each arena corresponds to a certain trophy range.

The original Legendary Arena represented the final arena following Serenity Peak, and it consisted of "Leagues", which were added to the game in March 2017. In the League system, players play through nine different leagues above 5000 trophies ranging from Challenger I to Ultimate Champion. At the end of each season, the player is reset to half of the trophies they gained above 5000 trophies. In the October 2022 update, this reset system was done away with in favor of a longer trophy road with more arenas, as well as a separate competitive gameplay mode (called Path of Legends) that would follow a similar model as the Legendary Arena.

Cards
Playable troops, buildings, and spells are represented as cards. Many cards are directly based on troops and buildings from Supercell's previous game Clash of Clans, such as giants and cannons, and the game uses a similar art style. Prior to each battle (with the exception of the first battle in Training Camp), players construct a deck of eight cards which they use to attack and defend against their opponent's cards. At the start of each game, both players begin with four randomly chosen cards from their deck of eight, with the exceptions of Mirror and Elixir Collector.

Each card costs a certain amount of elixir to play. Players start the battle with five elixir points (zero in Double and Triple Elixir modes), and one elixir point is replenished every 2.8 seconds (or 1.4 seconds in Double Elixir Mode, the final 60 seconds of the game and the first minute of overtime; and roughly every 0.9 seconds during Triple Elixir Mode and the last minute of overtime), to a maximum of ten elixir points. Once a card is played, a new card is automatically drawn from the player's eight card deck.

Clash Royale first launched with 42 cards, consisting of 14 cards for each of three levels of rarity: Common, Rare, and Epic. The February 2016 update added two new cards under a new rarity level: Legendary. In October 2021, a new Champion card rarity was added to the game, with three new cards being added. These cards differentiate from other cards as a player can only have one Champion in their deck, and each Champion has a special ability that can be activated by spending additional elixir (for example, the Golden Knight's Dash ability costs 1 additional elixir). Subsequent updates have added cards to all the aforementioned rarity levels. , there are a total of 109 cards in the game.

All cards now cap at level 14 with Common cards starting at level 1, Rare cards starting at level 3, Epic cards starting at level 6, Legendary cards starting at level 9, and Champion cards starting at level 11. All cards and crown tower levels are level 11 for all tournaments, except private tournaments, where you can set a cap to card and crown tower levels.

The December 2018 update added Star Points to unlock special golden cosmetics for Max Level cards. In the October 2021 update, this was changed to be available from Level 7. Players also receive Star Points when gaining experience, which can be used to give their cards an updated visual skin, usually gold in color. There are up to three Star Levels for each card, which are unlocked when the card is leveled up to level 7 (for Star Level 1), level 10 (for Star Level 2) and level 13 (for Star Level 3).

In the March 2022 update, card masteries were launched, which provided rewards for reaching specific milestones with cards in competitive matches. Statistics range from damage done, to troops destroyed, to towers tapped. Badges display a player's progress, and badges could be gained for other milestones as well such as wins in different game modes.

Clans
Starting from Experience level 1, players can join or form clans. Joining or forming a clan enables the player to engage in friendly battles and clan wars. It also unlocks the feature of requesting cards when a player is level 3. Clan trading with the use of trade tokens unlocks when a player reaches level 8. There are four different types of trade tokens: Common, Rare, Epic and Legendary, corresponding to those card levels. Trade tokens can be obtained by gaining trophies, through challenges, and from the in-game shop. Each can be used to trade a certain amount of cards with other players, depending on the rarity of the trade token.

Clan Wars I
On April 25, 2018, Clan Wars were added. Initially, a given war would be separated into two days: "Collection Day" and "War Day." Collection Day saw players battling in a variety of game modes which would rotate every month. Winning awarded cards to add to the Clan collection. If a minimum of ten players played one battle each, the Clan could progress to War Day, where a Clan was matched with four other Clans with a similar number of participants and Clan Trophies. Each participant would build a battle deck using only the cards unlocked on Collection Day. After the battles, each clan was ranked from 1st to 5th based on the number of Crowns awarded by wins. At the end of the War Day, all participating players received a War Bounty containing Gold or other items. Based on their war rank, Clans would then gain or lose a certain number of Trophies. Clans would progress through Clan Leagues by gaining Clan Trophies, with higher leagues granting better rewards. Clan Seasons lasted two weeks, and at the end of each season, a chest is awarded to every participating player based on the highest war rank and league the Clan had reached during the season.

Clan Wars II
On August 31, 2020, Clan Wars II was added as a reworked version of its predecessor. Each week consists of three "Training Days" and four "Battle Days." During Training Days, participants can add troops to their respective Clan Boat, which mark the progress in the week's war and add movement bonuses based on surviving troops. Battles are fought with 32 total cards from the player's collection being used to make four unique war-decks with no overlapping cards. War-decks can be play-tested during these Training Days, though enemy Boats cannot be attacked until Battle Days. On Battle Days, players have the option of several battle variations, with medals awarded based on wins and participation. Like the original Clan Wars, Clan Trophies are still awarded for the clan's placement in the War, determined by which Clan Boat makes it the farthest in the River Race. After a week, the cycle will reset to Training Days, and each total War lasts five weeks, while each clan loses or gains trophies each week depending on where they finished that week. On the fifth week, the clan's boat stops at the Colosseum as the final round of battles before a new cycle begins against a new set of rival Clans.

Release
The game was soft-launched in Canada, Hong Kong, Australia, Sweden, Norway, Denmark, Iceland, Finland, and New Zealand for iOS platforms on January 4, 2016. The game was soft-launched on Android for those same countries on February 16, 2016, in the form of an Android application package. Both platforms received a global release on March 2, 2016.

Upon its release, Clash Royale became the most downloaded and top-grossing app on the U.S. iOS App Store.

Reception

Clash Royale mainly received positive reviews, with TouchArcade Eli Hodapp calling it "absolutely phenomenal" in his five-star review. Pocket Gamer Harry Slater gave the game a score of 9/10, summing up "It's an incredible amount of rewarding fun, it's nail-biting at times, and there's content here that will keep you busy for weeks if not months." Writing for Geek.com, James Plafke criticized "Clash Royale for being genuinely fun—more so than Clash of Clans—while the developer chronically interrupts the player from enjoying it." Clash Royale has received a positive response from its players, with an average score of 4.2 out of 5 on the Google Play Store and an average score of 4 out of 5 on the Apple App Store.

Championships

Clash Royale League
The Clash Royale League was the official team esports world championship on a league format, developed by Supercell. It consisted of 5 leagues: North America, Europe, Latin America, Asia, and China. Season 1 started on August 20, 2018. After fifteen games per team during the regular season, playoffs were held in each region, after which the World Finals were held in Tokyo, Japan on December 1. The Finalists consisted of Nova Esports (China), KingZone Dragon-X (Asia), Vivo Keyd (Latin America), Team Queso (Europe), Immortals (North America), and Ponos Sports from Japan. Ponos achieved second in Asia and was allowed into the World Finals because of Japan's host status. A seeding tournament ranked the teams. After that the top two teams from the seeding tournament got a bye for the Quarter-Finals and automatically made it into the Semi-Finals. After the Quarter Finals it was the Semi-Finals then the Finals. The Season One World Champions are Nova Esports.

Crown Royale Crown Championship
The Clash Royale Crown Championship was the official esports world championship of the game, developed by Supercell. The tournament connects the best players all over the world from North America, Asia, Latin America, Europe, and more. The first edition had over 28 million participants all over the world, becoming the world's largest Clash Royale event. The first world champion was Sergio Ramos who beat MusicMaster by three games to one on the Crown Championship World Finals. The 2017 Crown Championship in London, top 16 “Clash Royale” players in the world competed for a $400,000 prize pool. The 2018 Clash Royale Crown Championship is scheduled to be held in Asia.

Asian Games
Clash Royale was part of an esport demonstration event during the 2018 Asian Games held in Indonesia. Eight countries are able to participate after having qualified from their respective regional qualification with Indonesia automatically qualified as host.

Awards and nominations

See also
 Clash of Clans
 Real-time strategy

References

External links
 

2016 video games
Android (operating system) games
IOS games
Esports games
Free-to-play video games
Multiplayer online games
Strategy video games
Video games developed in Finland
Supercell (video game company) games
Video games containing battle passes
BAFTA winners (video games)
Video game spin-offs